Wattana Wittaya Academy (W.W.A;) is Thailand's first boarding school for girls. 
It was established in 1878 at the palace of the Third King of the Chakri Dynasty.  The original name was Kullasatri Wanglang. It is located in Wattana, Bangkok.

History 
Wattana Wittaya Academy is under the Foundation of the Church of Christ in Thailand. It was founded in A.D. 1874 by the American Presbyterian Mission and was originally named "Kullasatri Wanglang".  Located in the Royal Palace which is now within the compound of Siriraj Hospital. It was the first boarding school for girls and the first kindergarten of Thailand. Mrs. Harriet M. House was the first principal. The primary objectives of the school were to educate Thai young ladies in the fundamentals of reading, writing, Bible study and sewing.

In A.D. 1921, Miss Edna S. Cole moved the school campus to its present location and changed the name to "Wattana Wittaya Academy".

Type of school and location 
Wattana Wittaya Academy is a girls’ school under the supervision of the Committee of Private Sector. It is a day school from Kindergarten through grade 6 and boarding school from grade 7 through grade 12. The school is located on Sukumvit 19, in the heart of Bangkok.  The beautiful 100 rai campus, of which 51 rai are education facilities, is surrounded by hospitals, hotels, banks and government offices. The school has a large open-air loudspeaker system that it uses to communicate to the students from 7 am until 9 pm.

English Intensive Course 
At present, W.W.A. provides an English Intensive Course for students in the elementary and secondary levels. This program serves students whose focus is on expanding their talent and strength in English through an advanced curriculum and learning environment.

Kindergarten level 
W.W.A. opened its first kindergarten in Thailand in B.E. 2450 (A.D.1907). Khunying Aroon Methathibodi was the first kindergarten teacher. 
The present kindergarten offers instruction in the three grade levels, K1-K3.
 Day students.
 Boys and girls 3–5 years of age.

Elementary level 
 Day students, girls only.
 Enrollment is from grade 1–6

Secondary level 
The girls boarding school for the secondary level has become the trademark of this school since its origin as Wanglang School. The boarding section offers a rigorous academic environment and moral discipline to prepare the girls for their future life educationally, professionally and socially. 
Various programs are offered to expand students’ knowledge and experiences including exchange programs with Canada and Japan.  
Enrollment is from grade 7–12. 
Admission to all 3 levels is based on the school's entrance test results.

Activities 
 Art club
 Sports club
 Boarding and Day Prefects 
 Third Languages 
 Community Service Council 
 Dorm Council
 Drama Club / English Play
 English is Fun Club
 Girls Helping Girls – Peer mentors
 Music Club
 Noise Creation Club
 Private Music Lessons
 Singing club / Chorus (open air)
 Student Ambassadors 
 Student Council
 Yearbook Committee
 Young librarians
 Young Politicians

Campus facilities 
 Auditoriums
 Air-conditioned dorms
 Audiovisual Equipment
 Carpark facilities
 Computer rooms
 Co-operative Store
 Counseling rooms
 Dining Hall
 Libraries
 Nursing rooms
 Religion rooms
 Swimming Pool
 Teacher offices equipped with computers and wireless access.

Notable alumni
 Punnara Phoomchareon, Thai beauty queen
 Bua Kitiyakara, Thai actress, the wife of Nakkhatra Mangala, Prince of Chanthaburi II and the mother of Queen Sirikit
 Rasri Balenciaga Chirathiwat, Thai actress and model
 Minnie, Thai singer-songwriter, dancer composer, record producer, model, actress and K-pop idol, member of K-pop girlgroup (G)I-dle (Real Name: Nicha Yontararak) 
Pat Chayanit Chansangavej, Thai-Chinese actress
Thanpuying Puangroi Apaiwong, Thai composer

References
http://web.wattana.ac.th/english/index.htm

Girls' schools in Thailand
Educational institutions established in 1878
Schools in Bangkok
Watthana district
Boarding schools in Thailand
1878 establishments in Siam